High Voltage Hot Rod Show is a WiiWare game developed by High Voltage Software. It was released in North America on January 19, 2009.

Gameplay
High Voltage Hot Rod Show sees players racing hot rods around a track from an overhead view. The game also incorporates a stunt system to give players boosts that progressively increases their overall speed. The game is played over 6 tracks with 5 racers to choose from. It also includes up to 4 player split-screen offline multiplayer, and a Time Trial mode with online leaderboards.

The game features a number of control options for players, including steering their vehicle with the motion controls of the Wii Remote alone or with the thumbstick on the Nunchuk, with the game also supporting the Classic Controller and GameCube controllers.

Development

High Voltage Hot Rod Show was inspired by games such as R.C. Pro-Am and Micro Machines, with the style of the characters and vehicles taking inspiration from Kustom Kulture and the artwork of Ed Roth and Kenny Howard amongst others.

The game runs on High Voltage Software's Quantum 3 game engine that was used in High Voltage's previous WiiWare game Gyrostarr. The game originally was to feature 8 tracks, but 2 were cut due to Nintendo's WiiWare game size restrictions.

Reception
IGN scored the game a 6/10, noting the "inherently thin" content of the game and citing gameplay that follows a "very shallow, by-the-books design" that lacks polish. Wiiloveit.com gave it a 24/30, praising the "skill-oriented" gameplay, and "compelling trick system", but also commented that the game's lack of depth and "extended replay value" was its biggest flaw.

References

External links
High Voltage Hot Rod Show Game Trailer

2009 video games
Racing video games
Wii-only games
WiiWare games
Wii Wi-Fi games
Nintendo Wi-Fi Connection games
Wii games
High Voltage Software games
North America-exclusive video games
Video games developed in the United States
Multiplayer and single-player video games